Louis De Ridder (9 June 1902 – 5 May 1981) was a Belgian athlete who competed in ice hockey, speed skating and bobsleigh at the 1924 and 1936 Winter Olympics. His best achievement was fifth place in the four-man bobsleigh event in 1936. As a speed skater, he placed 19th in both the 500 m and 1500 m events in 1924. He was part of the Belgian ice hockey teams that finished 7th and 13th in 1924 and 1936, respectively. He won two medals at the Ice Hockey European Championships in 1924 and 1927.  In 1930 he represented Belgium at the first recorded and recognised European Roller Speed Skating Championships on the road in his home town of Anvers (Antwerp) where he took the gold medal in all three events, the 1000 m, 10000 m and 25000 m.

References

External links

1924 speed skating men's 500 m results
1924 speed skating men's 1500 m results
1936 bobsleigh four-man results
1936 Olympic Winter Games official report. – p. 414.
Wallechinsky, David (1984). "Ice Hockey". In The Complete Book of the Olympics: 1896–1980. New York: Penguin Books. p. 563. (shown as "de Ridder")

1902 births
1981 deaths
Belgian male bobsledders
Belgian male speed skaters
Olympic speed skaters of Belgium
Olympic ice hockey players of Belgium
Bobsledders at the 1936 Winter Olympics
Ice hockey players at the 1924 Winter Olympics
Ice hockey players at the 1936 Winter Olympics
Speed skaters at the 1924 Winter Olympics
Belgian ice hockey defencemen
Sportspeople from Antwerp